Zhovte is a village in Luhansk Raion (district) in Luhansk Oblast of eastern Ukraine, at about 17.8 km NW from the centre of Luhansk city, on the right bank of the Siverskyi Donets river.

The War in Donbass, that started in mid-April 2014, has brought along both civilian and military casualties.

References

Slavyanoserbsky Uyezd

Villages in Luhansk Raion